Rasmus Kupari (born 15 March 2000) is a Finnish professional ice hockey forward currently playing for the Ontario Reign in the American Hockey League (AHL) as a prospect to the Los Angeles Kings of the National Hockey League (NHL). He was selected 20th overall by the Kings in the 2018 NHL Entry Draft.

Playing career
Kupari made his professional and Liiga debut with Kärpät in the 2017–18 season on 14 September 2017. He scored his first goal on 28 September 2017. He completed his first professional season as an 18-year old with 6 goals and 14 points in 39 games.

On June 22, 2018, Kupari was selected in the first-round, 20th overall, by the Los Angeles Kings in the 2018 NHL Entry Draft. He was later signed to a three-year, entry-level contract with the Kings on July 13, 2018.

Career statistics

Regular season and playoffs

International

References

External links

2000 births
Living people
Ice hockey players at the 2016 Winter Youth Olympics
Finnish ice hockey centres
Kokkolan Hermes players
Los Angeles Kings draft picks
Los Angeles Kings players
National Hockey League first-round draft picks
Ontario Reign (AHL) players
Oulun Kärpät players
People from Kotka
Sportspeople from Kymenlaakso